The Vermetoidea, the worm snails or worm shells, are a taxonomic superfamily of small to medium-sized sea snails, marine gastropod molluscs in the order Littorinimorpha.

The shells of species in the family Vermetidae are extremely irregular, and do not resemble the average snail shell, hence the common name "worm shells" or "worm snails"

Families
 Sakarahellidae Bandel, 2006
 Vermetidae Rafinesque, 1815

References

Littorinimorpha